This partial list of city nicknames in Kansas compiles the aliases, sobriquets and slogans that cities in Kansas are known by (or have been known by historically), officially and unofficially, to municipal governments, local people, outsiders or their tourism boards or chambers of commerce. City nicknames can help in establishing a civic identity, helping outsiders recognize a community or attracting people to a community because of its nickname; promote civic pride; and build community unity. Nicknames and slogans that successfully create a new community "ideology or myth" are also believed to have economic value. Their economic value is difficult to measure, but there are anecdotal reports of cities that have achieved substantial economic benefits by "branding" themselves by adopting new slogans.

Some unofficial nicknames are positive, while others are derisive. The unofficial nicknames listed here have been in use for a long time or have gained wide currency.
Baxter Springs – First Cowtown in Kansas
Beattie – Milo Capital of the World
Cassoday – Prairie Chicken Capital of the World
Cawker City – Home of the World's Largest Ball of Twine
Dodge City
Queen of the Cowtowns
The Wickedest Little City in America
Emporia – Front Porch of the Flint Hills
Garden City – Cutting Horse Capital
Girard – Printing Capital of the Nation
Haysville – Peach Capital of Kansas
Jennings – Czech Us Out
Kansas City
 KCK
 Heart of America
Kirwin – Goose Capital
La Crosse – Barbed Wire Capital of the World
Lansing – City With a Future
Lawrence
 River City
 LFK
Lenexa – Spinach Capital
Leoti – Pinto Bean Capital
Liberal – The Land of Oz
Lindsborg – Little Sweden
Manhattan – The Little Apple
 Marion
Rhino Capital of Kansas
Town Between Two Lakes
Marysville – Black Squirrel Capital
Norton – Pheasant Capital of Kansas
Olathe – Cowboy Boot Capital
Parsons – Purple Martin Capital
Pittsburg – Fried Chicken Capital
Quinter – Half Mile High City
Russell Springs – Cow Chip Capital of Kansas
Topeka – Top City
Wellington – Wheat Capital of the World
Wichita
Air Capital of the World
The Emerald City
ICT
Wilson – Czech Capital of Kansas
Windom – Covered Dish Capital of the World

See also
 List of cities in Kansas
List of city nicknames in the United States

References

Kansas
Populated places in Kansas
City nicknames